Christopher Haigh is a British historian specialising in religion and politics around the English Reformation. Until his retirement in 2009, he was Student and Tutor in Modern History at Christ Church, Oxford and University Lecturer at Oxford University.  He was educated at Churchill College, Cambridge and the University of Manchester. Haigh was a very influential revisionist in Tudor historiography and on the English Reformation. Haigh's writings mostly demonstrated that, contrary to orthodox understandings of the English Reformation, religious reform was extremely complex and varied considerably at a parish level. Haigh has also been noted for his work in diminishing the significance attributed to anticlericalism prior to 1530. His revisionism formed part of a broader wave in Tudor historiography with other historians such as Eamon Duffy.

Works
Reformation and Resistance in Tudor Lancashire, Cambridge University Press, 1975
The English Reformation Revised, Cambridge University Press, 1987
English Reformations: Religion, Politics and Society under the Tudors, Oxford University Press, 1993
Politics in an Age of Peace and War, 1570-1630 in The Oxford Illustrated History of Tudor and Stuart Britain, Oxford, 1996, pp. 330–360
Elizabeth I, London, 1988
Success and Failure in the English Reformation, Past & Present. Vol 173 (1) (2001) pp. 28–49
The Troubles of Thomas Pestell: Parish Squabbles and Ecclesiastical Politics in Caroline England, Journal of British Studies. Vol 41 (2002) pp. 403–428
The Reformation in England to 1603 in The Blackwell Companion to the Reformation, Oxford, 2003
Clergy JPs in England and Wales, 1590-1640, The Historical Journal, vol 47, 2004, pp. 233–259
The Character of an Antipuritan, Sixteenth Century Journal, vol XXXV, 2004, pp. 671–88
A G Dickens and the English Reformation, Historical Research, vol 77, 2004, pp. 24–38
The Plain Man's Pathways to Heaven: Kinds of Christianity in Post-Reformation England, 1570-1640, Oxford University Press, 2007

References

External links
 Christopher Haigh's website
 article by Haigh on Roderigo Lopez

British historians
Reformation historians
Living people
Year of birth missing (living people)